Stormin' Home is a 1985 American made-for-television drama film directed by Jerry Jameson and starring Gil Gerard.

Plot
A truck driver dreams of returning to motorcycle racing.

Cast
Gil Gerard as Bobby Atkins
Lisa Blount as Sissy Rigetti
Pat Corley as Broker
Emily Moultrie as Annie
Joanna Kerns as Lana Singer
John Pleshette as Al Singer 
Geoffrey Lewis as Scooter Lee

Production
The movie was filmed in Texas.

References

1985 television films
1985 films
1985 drama films
American drama television films
CBS network films
Films shot in Texas
Films directed by Jerry Jameson
Films scored by Bruce Broughton
1980s American films
1980s English-language films